The University of Montevallo is a public university in Montevallo, Alabama. Founded on October 12, 1896, the university is Alabama's only public liberal arts college and a member of the Council of Public Liberal Arts Colleges. The University of Montevallo Historic District was established in 1979 and included 16 buildings on campus. It was expanded in 1990 to include 75 buildings total. It is located in a rural location in central Alabama.

History

The main part of the campus was designed by the Olmsted brothers and the central part is a historic district listed on the National Register of Historic Places. The university opened in October 1896 as the Alabama Girls' Industrial School (AGIS), a women-only technical school that also offered high school-level courses. AGIS became the Alabama Girls' Technical Institute in 1911, further adding "and College for Women" in 1919. The school gradually developed as a traditional degree-granting institution, becoming Alabama College, State College for Women in 1923.

The school effectively became coeducational after lobbying by the school's supporters resulted in the Alabama Legislature passing a bill on January 15, 1956 to remove the designation "State College for Women". The first men entered the school that same month. Its student body still maintains a 7:5 ratio of women to men.

In 1965, the board of trustees authorized President D.P. Culp to sign the Certificates of Assurance of Compliance with the Civil Rights Act of 1964. In the fall of 1968, three African American women, Carolyn Burpo, Ruby Kennbrew and Dorothy (Lilly) Turner, enrolled in the university. On September 1, 1969, Alabama College was renamed the University of Montevallo.

The Alabama Girls' Industrial School was listed on the National Register in 1978. In 1990, the University of Montevallo Historic District was listed on the National Register, as an expansion.

Montevallo is in the geographic center of Alabama in an area rich with Civil War history. Many of the buildings on campus predate the founding of the college, including King House (reserved for special guests of the campus) and Reynolds Hall (used by the Theater Department and alumni relations). King House was reportedly the first home in Alabama to receive pane glass windows. With nearly 3,000 students, the university has a significant economic impact on the surrounding communities in Shelby County.

Traditions

College Night 
The University of Montevallo's homecoming tradition, called College Night, is a coeducational competition in which students may participate for either the Purple Side or the Gold Side, named after the school's colors. The tradition of College Night began as a celebration of the upcoming renaming of Alabama Girls' Technical Institute to Alabama College. First taking place on March 3, 1919, as a competition between the four classes, the Class of 1919 said that "now that our school is becoming a college, we have begun to take up college stunts."

The main event of College Night is the performance of musical theater productions by each side. Said musicals are composed, directed, produced, and performed entirely by student participants. The productions last from Wednesday through Saturday on the week of College Night. The competition also currently involves four athletic events: men's and women's basketball, women's volleyball, and men's ultimate Frisbee. During halftime at the men's basketball game, which is played on Saturday afternoon before the final musical performances, a cheer competition between the Purple Side and the Gold Side takes place. Additionally, both sides craft signs which are revealed and displayed in front of Farmer Hall, the campus's student union building. It is after the final production on Saturday night when either a Purple Victory or a Gold Victory is declared until the next year's College Night. The victor of College Night is decided based on a system of points derived from each side's degree of sportsmanship, how well they perform in the various events, and how the three judges of the student-led productions rate each side's show.

In honor of A.G.T.I.'s 25th anniversary in 1921, College Night became a competition between two sides, Purple and Gold, instead of a competition between the classes. Since then, both sides have adopted mascots; Purple Side adopted the cow as theirs, and Gold Side adopted the lion as theirs. Each side has a song that is sung only when members of the side join hands, forming a circle; whereas Purple Side's circle is connected 360° around, Gold Side leaves a small hole in their circle. When "circled up," the leaders of each side ask a question to all the other members of their respective sides. Purple Side's leaders ask, "Why is their never a hole in our circle?" Their side always responds with, "Because! A united circle is a united side! Let the circle be unbroken!" Gold Side's leaders ask their side, "Why is there always a hole in our circle?" Their side responds by saying, "Because! There's always room for one more Gold!"

In 2000, College Night was declared a "Local Legacy" by the Library of Congress, with an exhibit containing audio recordings of Purple and Gold side songs, photographs, College Night programs, and other artifacts.

Crook Week/Senior March

Traditionally, Crook Week was a week in late October when the senior class women would hide the "crook"—a staff shaped roughly like a shepherd's crook—and give obscure clues for the underclass women who were to find it.

At the end of Crook Week was Senior March. When the chimes struck thirteen, if the underclass women did not find the crook, the seniors march on them, getting them out of their rooms and onto Main Quad where they would have a shaving cream and water balloon battle. If the underclass women found the crook, they were safe that year. This tradition ended in the 1990s because the administration considered it hazing.

Today, the Hiding of the Crook occurs the week of Founders' Day. The administration hides the crook and leaves clues as to where it can be found. The finder of the crook gets recognized at Founders' Day with a small prize.

Life Raft Debate 
The Life Raft Debate is an annual event sponsored by the Philosophy Club. The debate has occurred each fall semester since 1998, on the second Thursday in October during the university's Founders' Day commemoration.

In the Life Raft Debate, the audience is asked to imagine that there has been a nuclear war and that they, as the survivors, are setting sail to rebuild society from the ground up. There are a group of professors vying to win the coveted Oar and get on the raft, and only one seat is left. Each professor has to argue that his or her discipline is the one indispensable area of study that the new civilization will need to flourish.

Each professor gets to give an introductory account of his or her discipline then a brief rebuttal to the others. At the end of the debate, the audience votes and the lucky winner claims the Oar and climbs aboard, waving goodbye to the others. Often, a seventh participant, the Devil's Advocate, appears and tries to convince the audience that the entire panel is unworthy and that all should be left behind to drown. In the following year, the defending champion faces five new challengers in a new debate. To date, no one has successfully defended the Oar.

The first event was held in 1998 before an audience of roughly 200 people. Michael Sterner of the Mathematics Department carried the day with an impassioned defense of his discipline, touting both its usefulness and beauty and promising that, if he were to be saved, there would be "no more word problems ever." In the subsequent years the debate's popularity grew to attract more than 800 audience members per year. Following years saw victories by professors from a variety of academic disciplines.

On March 12, 2010, the public radio show This American Life ran a story on the Life Raft Debate entitled "I'd Like to Spank the Academy." The story followed the events of the 2007 Life Raft Debate in which the Devil's Advocate, Jon Smith, a professor in the Department of English, successfully argued that all the panelists should be drowned because they were merely trying to be funny, not to educate or to defend the importance of their respective disciplines. Following the broadcast, several colleges and universities in the United States and abroad began hosting Life Raft Debates of their own.

Campus resources

James Wylie Shepherd Observatory
The James Wylie Shepherd Observatory at the University of Montevallo was opened in the Fall of 2009. The observatory was built on the site of a former construction landfill, now remade into Gentry Springs field. The observatory is a U of M sustainability landmark.

The observatory is located roughly three miles from the main campus on the 150-acre Gentry Springs site owned by the university. The JWSO is capable of astronomical telescopic observation and astrophotography, has a dedicated telescope for solar viewing, and is one of very few observatories in the country that is designed specifically to be completely accessible to people of all disabilities.

Besides its observing capabilities, the JWSO will be a green facility, employing self-composting toilets, filtered rainwater and solar-generated electricity. The facility is currently used by UM classes, the Montevallo Astronomical Society, AMSTI partners and a variety of area K-12 classes and other local groups. There are also regularly-scheduled public viewing nights that are free of charge.

Upon completion, the observing complex will house an outdoor planetarium/amphitheater, a docent's cabin, walking trails, a digital indoor planetarium, a visiting scholar's dormitory, educational exhibits and a visitors' center in which groups can see images generated by the main telescope.  Additional smaller scopes for solar and planetary observing can be set up at various locations outside the main dome, which is surrounded by solar-powered outdoor low-level lighting.

Ebenezer Swamp Ecological Preserve

Spring Creek and Ebenezer Swamp form a portion of the headwaters for the ecologically diverse and environmentally sensitive Cahaba River Watershed. The Cahaba is the longest remaining free-flowing river, has more species of fish per mile than any river in North America and is one of eight river biodiversity hotspots in the U.S.

UM is creating the Ebenezer Swamp Wetlands Interpretive and Research Center (ESWIRC) to focus greater research on wetland ecology and to increase educational opportunities for high school and middle school students from across the state of Alabama.  Research goals center on: establishing and maintaining an inventory of plant, animal and fungal species; monitoring water quality, rainfall and stream flow rates; and future studies of wetland ecological processes and the effects of encroachment along the swamp margin.  Education goals center on raising the profile of the ecologic importance of wetlands to high school and middle school students, while simultaneously providing them with a sound introduction to the underlying principles of biology.

ValloCycle: Montevallo Bike-Share Program
Formed through a collaborative partnership between the City of Montevallo and the University of Montevallo, the ValloCycle Bike-Share Program exists as a citywide initiative to enhance overall community walkability and individual citizen engagement with a lifestyle of sustainable, alternative transportation. The ValloCycle Bike-Share Program's primary means of achieving these goals is through its day-to-day operation of the ValloCycle Bike-Share Program, the first county-wide bicycle sharing program in the state of Alabama to offer low-cost bicycle rentals to all the members of its community.

Unlike other nearby campus bike-share programs, ValloCycle bicycle rentals are not limited solely to university students and are also not confined to one location. Rather, bicycle rentals are offered to all residents of Montevallo and the surrounding Shelby County area in three separate check-out locations. Annual membership fees amount to roughly $2 a month for adults and $1 a month per child.

The all-volunteer ValloCycle Board oversees the implementation of a number of other campus and community programs, events, resources and public bicyclist/pedestrian infrastructure enhancements, including the Montevallo "Share the Lane" Initiative, the ValloCycle Town Map Project, and the Montevallo "Tour By Bike". Membership forms are available at ValloCycle's public website, vallocycle.com.

Anagama Kiln
Montevallo's kiln was hand-built by the ceramics professor Scott Meyer and students beginning in 1999.
Fired once or twice a year, the kiln fires for 100 hours and consumes up to 14 cords of split wood.

Carmichael Library

Oliver Cromwell Carmichael Library, is on Bloch Street, since 1968.

Greek life

Interfraternity Council

Panhellenic Council

National Pan-Hellenic Council

Professional and Honorary Societies

Disc golf course
In 2007, The University of Montevallo in cooperation with the Professional Disc Golf Association built a full size, 18 hole, disc golf course on the grounds of the campus. At the time of its construction it was one of the few courses located on the campus of a public university in the region. Despite the fact that it is on university grounds and maintained by school staff it is open to the public and has provided a source of cooperation and connection between the community and the school. In recent years several University of Montevallo Greek organizations have sponsored various holes in order to help with maintenance and upkeep.

Athletics

The University of Montevallo fields 19 NCAA Division II athletic teams that currently compete in the Gulf South Conference.

Men's sports include baseball, basketball, soccer, golf, lacrosse, tennis and track, cross-country. Women's sports include lacrosse, basketball, soccer, golf, cross-country, tennis, volleyball and track and field. The Falcons were members of the Gulf South Conference from 1995 until 2009.  They then competed in the Peach Belt Conference until re-joining the GSC before the 2017–18 academic year.

Notable faculty and staff
 Oliver Carmichael, served as President of Alabama College from 1926 to 1935; later served as Chancellor of Vanderbilt University from 1937 to 1946 and as President of the University of Alabama from 1953 to 1957.  He is also the namesake of the Oliver Cromwell Carmichael Library at the University of Montevallo.
Margaret Cuninggim, taught at the University of Montevallo. Later, she served as Dean of Women at the University of Tennessee and Vanderbilt University.
 Garnie W. McGinty, Louisiana historian taught briefly at UM prior to his longtime association with Louisiana Tech University.
 Eugene Sledge, PhD, recounted his experiences in the Pacific theater of World War II in the book With the Old Breed: At Peleliu and Okinawa. He is portrayed in the HBO miniseries "The Pacific." He was a professor of biology and a specialist in ornithology at the university until his death in 2001.
 John R. Steelman, sociologist at UM from 1928 to 1934 went on to become the first Assistant to the President of the United States (today called White House Chief of Staff) for Harry S. Truman from 1946 to 1953.
Olive Stone, sociologist known for her covert involvement with the Southern Negro Youth Congress and multiple Marxist reading groups in the Deep South
 Julia Tutwiler, 19th-century champion of equal educational opportunities for Alabama women, secured the funding that enabled AGIS to open in 1896. She also served as the first president of Livingston Normal College (now the University of West Alabama) and wrote a poem, "Alabama", that was later adapted as the official state song.

Notable alumni
Slade Blackwell, member of the Alabama Senate, 2010-2018
Beth Chapman, Secretary of State of Alabama, 2007–2013
Jim Dunaway, host of The Next Round, former TV news anchor for WIAT and WVTM, radio host
Matt Fridy,  judge on the Alabama Court of Civil Appeals and served in the Alabama House of Representatives from the 73rd district from 2014 to 2020
Hannah Godwin, television personality known for The Bachelor and Bachelor in Paradise
Rusty Greer, professional baseball player
Polly Holliday, actress best known for the character of Flo from the television show Alice
Jo Kittinger, children's book author, speaker, and President of SCBWI
Rebecca Luker, musical-theatre actress and three-time Tony Award nominee
Jon Maloney, professional soccer player All-time lead scorer for Montevallo Men's Soccer team and the only three-time Gulf South Conference Player of the Year
Ray Reach, jazz pianist, vocalist, arranger, composer, and educator
Doug Sisson, professional baseball coach
Rodger Smitherman, Democratic member of the Alabama Senate
Todd Strange, former mayor of Montgomery, Alabama
Nancy Worley, former president, Alabama Education Association; Secretary of State of Alabama, 2003–2007; chair, Alabama Democratic Party

References

Further reading
Griffith, Lucille. Alabama College, 1896-1969. Montevallo, AL: University of Montevallo, 1969.
Griffith, Lucille, White Columns & Red Brick: The University of Montevallo Buildings.  Montevallo, AL:  University of Montevallo Press, 1988.
Hultquist, Clark, and Carey Heatherly. Montevallo. Arcadia Press, 2011.
Kelley, 'Robin D.G. Hammer and Hoe: Alabama Communists during the Great Depression (Chapel Hill: UNC Press, 1990)
Nutting, Alissa. "Montevallo: A Mound in a Valley" Alabama Heritage 84 (Spring 2007): 18–29.
Tipton, Mary Frances. Years Rich and Fruitful:  University of Montevallo 1896–1996. Montevallo, AL: University of Montevallo, 1996.
Walker, Jefferson. College Night: A Centennial Celebration. Montevallo, AL: University of Montevallo, 2019.

External links
 Official website
 Anna Crawford Milner Archives & Special Collections

 
Montevallo
Educational institutions established in 1896
National Register of Historic Places in Shelby County, Alabama
Universities and colleges accredited by the Southern Association of Colleges and Schools
Montevallo
Education in Shelby County, Alabama
Buildings and structures in Shelby County, Alabama
Montevallo, Alabama
Historic districts on the National Register of Historic Places in Alabama
1896 establishments in Alabama
Montevalo
Public liberal arts colleges in the United States